Casanare Province was one of the provinces of Gran Colombia.

History 
It belonged to the Boyacá Department, which was created in 1824.

The capital was Moreno, now called Paz de Ariporo.

Watercolors painted in 1856 by Manuel María Paz provide early depictions of the Guahibo and Saliba people in Casanare Province.

See also 
 Casanare Department
 Casanare River

References 

Provinces of Gran Colombia
Provinces of the Republic of New Granada